N46 may refer to:
 N46 (Long Island bus)
 BMW N46, an automobile engine
 , a submarine of the Royal Navy
 Nebraska Highway 46, in the United States
 Nogizaka46, a Japanese idol group